The following lists events that happened during 2018 in the Democratic Republic of São Tomé and Príncipe.

Incumbents
President: Evaristo Carvalho
Prime Minister: Patrice Trovoada (until 3 December); Jorge Bom Jesus (from 3 December)

Events
1 January: currency reform: 1,000 old dobras became one new São Tomé and Príncipe dobra
3 December – Jorge Bom Jesus takes over as Prime Minister.

References

 
Years of the 21st century in São Tomé and Príncipe
2010s in São Tomé and Príncipe
São Tomé and Príncipe
São Tomé and Príncipe